Trudel may refer to:

People
Alain Trudel (born 1966), Canadian conductor, trombonist and composer
Claude Trudel (born 1942), Canadian politician
Denise Trudel (born 1955), Canadian politician
Ferdinand Trudel, politician in Quebec, Canada
François-Xavier-Anselme Trudel (1838–1890), politician in Quebec, Canada
Jacques Cossette-Trudel (born 1947), convicted kidnapper, Quebec separatist (FLQ)
Jacques Trudel (1919–2004), Liberal party member of the House of Commons of Canada
Jean-Guy Trudel (born 1975), Canadian former professional ice hockey left winger
Jean-Louis Trudel (born 1967), Canadian science fiction writer
Johanne Trudel (born 1953), judge currently serving on the Canadian Federal Court of Appeal
Karine Trudel, Canadian politician and MP for the federal riding of Jonquière
Louis Trudel (1912–1971), American professional ice hockey player
Louise Cossette-Trudel (born 1947), Canadian convicted kidnapper and writer
Luc Trudel, Canadian politician
Marc Trudel (1896–1961), politician in Quebec, Canada
Marcel Trudel (1917–2011), Canadian historian, university professor (1947–1982) and author
Olivier Trudel (1781–1859), farmer and political figure in Lower Canada
Rémy Trudel (born 1948), university professor and a former Quebec politician
Rene Trudel or Rene Trudell (1919–1984), professional ice hockey player
Robert Trudel (1820–1886), politician in Quebec, Canada
Sylvain Trudel (born 1963), French-Canadian writer
 Yves Trudel (1950-2022), Canadian actor

Geography and astronomy
Trudel, New Brunswick, Canadian village in Gloucester County, New Brunswick
Trudel Glacier, glacier at the head of Trudel Creek in southwestern British Columbia, Canada
21753 Trudel, an asteroid

See also
Miron v Trudel, a Supreme Court of Canada decision on equality rights
Strudel
Trousdell
Trudelj
Trudell
Truesdell (disambiguation)